Sunil Kant Munjal (born 1957) is an Indian businessman and the chairman of Hero Enterprise. He is also the founder of India's Serendipity Arts Festival, and is the chairman of the board of governors of The Doon School. He is the youngest son of Brijmohan Lall Munjal. In 2014, Munjal founded the BML Munjal University and currently serves as its chancellor.

References

External links
Bloomberg profile
UK India Business Council - Sunil Kant Munjal

Living people
Indian businesspeople
Businesspeople from Delhi
1960 births